Alexander John Joseph Doyle (born 28 August 1980) is a British musician. He is best known as the guitarist and synthesiser player for British indie electronic band Hot Chip and American rock band LCD Soundsystem. He is also a founding member of British electronic band New Build.

Early life
Doyle took piano and cello lessons from as young as 5 or 6 years old. He lost interest in these instruments as he began studying at university, when he began teaching himself other instruments, such as the guitar, drums, and bass guitar, and learned how to create music with computers. Doyle later won a place at Sidney Sussex College, Cambridge to read English alongside future Hot Chip bandmate Felix Martin.

Career

Hot Chip
Doyle joined British indie electronic band Hot Chip in 2003 before the recording session for their debut studio album, Coming on Strong (2004). Band co-founder Alexis Taylor called him to invite him to join the band while Doyle was unemployed and living in London, and he accepted. He remains a member of Hot Chip as of the release of A Bath Full of Ecstasy (2019), their seventh studio album.

LCD Soundsystem
Soon after the release of their self-titled debut studio album, Doyle joined American rock band LCD Soundsystem as a live member, as noted in the liner notes of their second studio album, Sound of Silver (2007). He would go on to play the Yamaha CS-60 and guitar on their 2010 song "You Wanted a Hit", the sixth track from their third studio album, This Is Happening (2010). In 2011, band frontman James Murphy announced that they were disbanding and would perform a farewell show at Madison Square Garden, where Doyle also played. The band would reunite, however, in 2015, to release a new album. Doyle became a much more prominent studio member of the band during the recording sessions, receiving writing credits on seven tracks out of the album's ten, and performing several instruments, including piano, cello, bowed mandolin, and electronic drums. The album, titled American Dream, was released on 1 September 2017.

New Build
Following LCD Soundsystem's disbandment in 2011, Doyle created the band New Build along with Hot Chip member Felix Martin and audio engineer Tom Hopkins. On 5 March 2012, they released their debut studio album, Yesterday Was Lived and Lost. They released a second studio album, Pour It On, on 20 October 2014.

Discography

With Hot Chip

Coming on Strong (2004)
The Warning (2006)
Made in the Dark (2008)
One Life Stand (2010)
In Our Heads (2012)
Why Make Sense? (2015)
A Bath Full of Ecstasy (2019)

With LCD Soundsystem

This Is Happening (2010)
American Dream (2017)
Electric Lady Sessions (2019)

With New Build
Yesterday Was Lived and Lost (2012)
Pour It On (2014)

References

Living people
Place of birth missing (living people)
English male guitarists
English rock keyboardists
English songwriters
LCD Soundsystem members
Alumni of Sidney Sussex College, Cambridge
1980 births
British male songwriters
Hot Chip members